Luperus flavipes is a species of skeletonizing leaf beetle belonging to the family Chrysomelidae, subfamily Galerucinae.

Distribution
This species can be found in most of Europe and in the Near East.

Description

Luperus flavipes can reach a length of 3.5–5 mm. The head and the elytra are bright black, while the legs are bright yellow (hence the species name flavipes), with  tibiae darkened towards the tip. The antennae are rather dark, long and wire-shaped, but the first segments are brighter yellow. The antennae are very long in males, shorter in the females. The pronotum is yellow orange. The body is quite tall and vaulted, the sides of the body are almost parallel but slightly wider at the back.

Biology
Adult beetles feed on leaves of broadleaved trees. They are mainly associated with beech, birch, alder, hawthorn, oaks, elm and hazel.

Overwintering takes place in the larval stage, as development is completed in the spring. The sexually mature beetles (imago) can be found in the middle of summer.

References

External links
 Chrysomelidae

Galerucinae
Beetles of Europe
Beetles described in 1767
Taxa named by Carl Linnaeus